Brown Township is one of twelve townships in Hendricks County, Indiana, United States. As of the 2010 census, its population was 11,593.

History
Brown Township was named for James Brown, a pioneer settler.

Geography
The stream of Pump Run flows through this township.

Cities and towns
 Brownsburg (north quarter)

Adjacent townships
 Eagle Township, Boone County (northeast)
 Pike Township, Marion County (east)
 Lincoln Township (south)
 Middle Township (west)
 Perry Township, Boone County (northwest)

Cemeteries
The township contains eight cemeteries: Ballard, Bethesda, Evans, Johnson, Macedonia, Marvel, Smith-Shepherd and Sparks.

Major highways
  Interstate 65
  Interstate 74
  Indiana State Road 267

Airports and landing strips
 Fuller Field

Education
Brown Township residents may obtain a free library card from the Brownsburg Public Library in Brownsburg.

References
 
 United States Census Bureau cartographic boundary files

External links

Townships in Hendricks County, Indiana
Townships in Indiana